Scottish Student Sport (SSS) formed in June 2005 as Scottish Universities Sport is the professional body for delivery and furthering of sports at university and college level.

The body was founded in 2005 following the merger of Scottish Universities Sports Federation and Scottish Universities Physical Education Association. SSS represent the Sports Unions and Sport and Exercise Departments of Scottish universities and colleges. Scottish Universities Sport was renamed to Scottish Student Sport in June 2011 following the admission of colleges as full members.

References 

Student sport in Scotland